Matěj Valenta (born 9 February 2000) is a Czech professional footballer who plays as a midfielder for Slovan Liberec on loan from Slavia Prague.

Club career

SK Slavia Praha
He made his league debut in Slavia's Czech First League 3–0 win at Teplice on 25 August 2018.

In January 2019, he joined Ústí nad Labem on loan.

SK Dynamo České Budějovice 
In summer of 2020, he joined SK Dynamo České Budějovice.

References

External links 
 
 Matěj Valenta official international statistics 
 

Czech footballers
Czech Republic youth international footballers
2000 births
Living people
Czech First League players
SK Slavia Prague players
FK Ústí nad Labem players
Association football midfielders
Czech National Football League players
Footballers from Prague
SK Dynamo České Budějovice players
FC Slovan Liberec players